Bar Zohar is a surname. Notable people with the surname include:

 Yael Bar-Zohar (born 1980), Israeli actress, model, and television host 
 Michael Bar Zohar (born 1938), Israeli historian, novelist, and politician

See also 
 Zohar (name)

Hebrew-language surnames
Surnames of Israeli origin